Herbert Nowell, M.D. (died 27-Dec-1953, Vancouver, British Columbia)  was a Canadian physician and professor. He is most noted for his philosophy of medicine (based on the "vital force" theory), his defence of herbalism as a valid medical profession, and his role in the founding of Dominion Herbal College in 1926 out of concern regarding the abandonment of botanical medicine by much of the medical establishment. He is also noted for his mentoring relationship with Ella Birzneck.

References 

Physicians from British Columbia
People from Vancouver
1953 deaths
Year of birth missing